Jack Willard Connell Jr. (born October 21, 1937) is an American politician. He served as a Democratic member in the Texas House of Representatives from 1959 to 1963. He was elected at the age of 21, having reached the minimum age of candidacy two weeks before the election.

He was sentenced to two years in prison along with 10 years of probation in 2008 for a drunk driving crash in 2006 that killed two people.

References

1937 births
Living people
Members of the Texas House of Representatives